Josef Bugala (23 August 1908 – 1 February 1999) was an Austrian international footballer.

References

1908 births
1999 deaths
Association football goalkeepers
Austrian footballers
Austria international footballers
SK Rapid Wien players
SV Neulengbach (men) players